A list of notable politicians of the National Democratic Party of Germany:

B
 Safet Babic
 Herbert Böhme 
 Friedhelm Busse

D
 Günter Deckert

F
 Gerhard Frey

K
 Erich Kern
 Michael Kühnen

M
 Horst Mahler
 Martin Mussgnug

N
 Harald Neubauer

P
 Jens Pühse

S
 Michael Swierczek

T
 Adolf von Thadden
 Friedrich Thielen

V
 Udo Voigt

National Democratic Party of Germany